Cumberland station is one of two commuter railroad stations on Metra's Union Pacific Northwest Line in the city of Des Plaines, Illinois.

As of April 25, 2022, Cumberland is served by 55 trains (27 inbound, 28 outbound) on weekdays, by 31 trains (16 inbound, 15 outbound) on Saturdays, and by 19 trains (nine inbound, 10 outbound) on Sundays.

While Metra gives the address as 475 East Northwest Highway, the main parking area is across the tracks and is only accessible from East Golf Road between a Union Pacific freight line crossing, and the intersection of Wolf and Seeger Roads, where East Golf Road turns under both the UP-NW Line and Northwest Highway. Along Northwest Highway itself, there is some parking along the eastbound lane between the State Street-Cornell Avenue intersection and the station house west of the bridge over East Golf Road.

Southeast of this station, the Union Pacific Northwest Line passes through Deval Tower, a three-way junction with the Canadian National Railway's Waukesha Subdivision (used by Metra's North Central Service) and the Union Pacific's "New Line" to Milwaukee.

Pace Bus connections
 208 Golf Road 
 221 Wolf Road 
 234 Wheeling/Des Plaines

References

External links
Metra - Cumberland Station
Station House from Google Maps Street View

Cumberland
Cumberland Station
Former Chicago and North Western Railway stations
Railway stations in Cook County, Illinois
Railway stations in the United States opened in 1967